The 1980–81 Scottish Cup was the 96th staging of Scotland's most prestigious football knockout competition. The Cup was won by Rangers who defeated Dundee United in the replayed final.

First round

Replays

Second round

Replays

Third round

Replays

Fourth round

Replays

Second Replay

Quarter-finals

Replay

Semi-finals

Replay

Final

Replay

See also
1980–81 in Scottish football
1980–81 Scottish League Cup

Scottish Cup seasons
1980–81 in Scottish football
Scot